"Everything (It's You)" is the thirteenth single released by Japanese rock band Mr. Children on February 5, 1997. The song was the theme song of Japanese television drama Koi no Vacance. The single debuted at No. 1 on the Japanese Oricon weekly single charts.

"Everything (It's You)" was certified as a million-selling single by the Recording Industry Association of Japan.

Track listing

References

1997 singles
Oricon Weekly number-one singles
Mr. Children songs
Japanese television drama theme songs
Songs written by Kazutoshi Sakurai
1997 songs
Toy's Factory singles